The International Reporting Program (IRP) is a program at the University of British Columbia Graduate School of Journalism, which gives students the opportunity to research and report under-covered stories from around the world and develop innovative ways of covering these issues. Student projects are featured on major news outlets including The New York Times, PBS, Al Jazeera, CBS, Global, Vice News and The Globe and Mail.  Past project have won some of the top media awards, including the Emmy for Best Investigation, two Sigma Delta Chi Awards from the Society of Professional Journalists, four Edward R. Murrow Awards from the Radio Television Digital News Association, two Webby honors, the Digital Publishing Award, an American Health Care Journalism Award, numerous Canadian Online Publishing Awards and several "Online News Association" nominations.

Past projects have taken students to China, India, Indonesia, Ghana, Togo, Benin, Cameroon, Chile, Brazil, Thailand, Ukraine, Russia and Jordan.

The program was created by professor Peter Klein with the help of a $1 million donation from Alison Lawton and the Mindset Social Innovation Foundation.

Awards

References

University of British Columbia